Now for a Feast! is a compilation album by English rock band Pop Will Eat Itself, released in November 1988 by Chapter 22 Records. It compiles their work before 1988, and has been re-released several times by different labels, each with a different selection of bonus tracks. The Cherry Red version, released as a 25th anniversary edition, contained almost every song released by the band while Graham Crabb was drumming, as well as several unreleased demos and versions, one live song, and three very rare demos recorded by Wild And Wandering, the previous incarnation of the band before their name was changed to Pop Will Eat Itself in 1986. The album is largely devoid of the grebo and electronic influences of later albums.

Track listing

Chapter 22/Rough Trade Editions

Other editions

Personnel
Pop Will Eat Itself
 Clint Mansell – lead vocals, guitars
 Adam Mole – guitars, keyboards, synthesizers
 Richard March – bass
 Graham Crabb – drums, backing and lead vocals

References

External links
 http://www.popwilleatitself.co.uk/now-for-a-feast/#.VXU038-qrWM
 http://pweination.com/pwei/
 http://www.discogs.com/Pop-Will-Eat-Itself-Now-For-A-Feast/release/3234757

Pop Will Eat Itself albums
1988 compilation albums